is the 3rd single of the Japanese duo Tegomass released on June 18, 2008 by Jonny's Entertainment. The single was used as ending theme for the anime Neo Angelique ~Abyss~. It ranked 1st on the Oricon Weekly Singles Chart and charted for 13 weeks.

Ai Ai Gasa is certified Gold by the RIAJ for shipment of 100,000 copies.

Title
Literally  means to share an umbrella, however, it could also be read as "Love-Love Umbrella", as the word for love (愛) is also pronounced ai. As such, sharing an umbrella as a couple in Japan is considered a romantic expression, and teens often draw an umbrella with their name and the name of their crush, the way one would in a heart.  In Tegomass's video, the two are creating rain to make a young boy and girl walk under an umbrella together.

Track lists
Limited edition track list:
 "Ai ai gasa"
 "Bokura no Uta"
 "Moshi mo Boku ga Pochi Dattara…"DVD track list: Ai ai gasa (PV)
 Ai ai gasa (Making)Regular edition track list:'''
 Ai ai gasa
 Bokura no Uta
 Moshi mo Boku ga Pochi Dattara…
 Boku no Cinderella
 Ai ai gasa (original karaoke)

References

2008 singles
Oricon Weekly number-one singles
Billboard Japan Hot 100 number-one singles
2008 songs
Torch songs